Kostiantynivka is a village in Cherkasy Raion, Cherkasy Oblast (province) of Ukraine. 

Kostiantynivka was previously located in the Smila Raion. The raion was abolished on 18 July 2020 as part of the administrative reform of Ukraine, which reduced the number of raions of Cherkasy Oblast to four. The area of Smila Raion was merged into Cherkasy Raion.

References

Notes

Villages in Cherkasy Raion